Weisen is a municipality in the Prignitz district, in Brandenburg, Germany. It consists of the main village Weisen, the small settlement Waldhaus and the village Schilde.

Geography 
Weisen is located between the towns of Wittenberge in the southwest and Perleberg in the northeast, from which Weisen is separated by a forest. The south border of Weisen is marked by the Stepenitz river with the municipality of Breese on the other side. The west border corresponds roughly to the Berlin–Hamburg Railway. The village of Schilde constitutes the northern part of the municipality of Weisen. North of Schilde is Dergenthin, which belongs to Perleberg.

The German federal highway 189 crosses between the villages Weisen and Schilde. The village of Weisen has a train stop on the Wittenberge–Wittstock–Berlin railway.

Weisen is situated in the Elbe Urstromtal. Parts of the municipality belong to the UNESCO biosphere reserve Elbe river landscape.

Demography

References

Localities in Prignitz